Brzezinki may refer to:

Brzezinki, Lower Silesian Voivodeship (south-west Poland)
Brzezinki, Kuyavian-Pomeranian Voivodeship (north-central Poland)
Brzezinki, West Pomeranian Voivodeship (north-west Poland)
Brzezinki, Łódź Voivodeship (central Poland)
Brzezinki, Jędrzejów County in Świętokrzyskie Voivodeship (south-central Poland)
Brzezinki, Kielce County in Świętokrzyskie Voivodeship (south-central Poland)
Brzezinki, Grójec County in Masovian Voivodeship (east-central Poland)
Brzezinki, Przysucha County in Masovian Voivodeship (east-central Poland)
Brzezinki, Radom County in Masovian Voivodeship (east-central Poland)
Brzezinki, Gmina Opatów in Silesian Voivodeship (south Poland)
Brzezinki, Gmina Wręczyca Wielka in Silesian Voivodeship (south Poland)
Brzezinki, Opole Voivodeship (south-west Poland)
Brzezinki, Pomeranian Voivodeship (north Poland)